Julien de Mallian (12 Novembre 1805 – March 1851) was a 19th-century French playwright.

He briefly studied law before turning to dramatic composition. His plays often signed only with his first name, were presented on the greatest Parisian stages of the 19th century: Théâtre de la Gaîté, Théâtre de l'Ambigu, Théâtre de la Porte-Saint-Martin, Théâtre des Variétés etc.

Works 

1828: La Cuisine au salon, ou le Cuisinier et le marmiton, one-act play, mingled with couplets, with Dumanoir
1828: La Semaine des amours, roman vaudeville in 7 chapters, with Dumanoir
1829: L'Audience du juge de paix, ou le Bureau de conciliation, tableau in 1 act, with Charles de Livry
1829: La Barrière du combat, ou le Théâtre des animaux, 2 tableaux mingled with animals and couplets, with de Livry and Adolphe de Leuven
1829: Frétillon ou la Bonne fille, comédie en vaudevilles in 1 act, preceded by La Première représentation, historical comedy in 3 parts, with Dumanoir and Michel Masson
1830: Le Charpentier, ou Vice est pauvreté, vaudeville populaire in 4 tableaux and preceded by Jour de la noce, prologue in one small act
1830: La Monnaie de singe, ou le Loyer de la danseuse, comédie en vaudevilles in 1 act, with Dumanoir
1830: Le Voyage de la mariée, imitation contemporaine de la Fiancée du roi de Garbe, with Dumanoir and de Leuven
1831: Camille Desmoulins, ou Les partis en 1794, historical drama in 5 acts, with Henri-Louis Blanchard
1831: Le Fossé des Tuileries, revue-vaudeville in 1 act, with Dumanoir and Victor Lhérie
1831: La Perle des maris, comédie en vaudevilles in 1 act, with Jean-François-Alfred Bayard and Dumanoir
1831: Saint-Denis, ou une insurrection de demoiselles, chronique de 1828, in 3 acts, mingled with couplets, with Dumanoir
1832: La jolie fille de Parme, drama in 3 acts and in 7 tableaux, preceded by a prologue, with Jules-Édouard Alboize de Pujol 
1832: Le dernier chapitre, comédie en vaudevilles in 1 act, with Dumanoir and Mélesville
1832: L'Homme qui bat sa femme, tableau populaire in 1 act, mingled with couplets, with Dumanoir
1832: Le Secret de la future, vaudeville in 1 act, with Léon Lévy Brunswick
1833: Les Deux roses, historical drama in 5 acts
1833: Les Fileuses, comédie en vaudevilles in 1 act
1833: Les Tirelaines, ou Paris en 1667, comédie en vaudevilles in 3 acts, with Dumanoir
1834: Le Juif errant, drama fantastic in 5 acts and 1 epilogue, with Merville
1834: Turiaf le pendu, comedy in 1 act, with Dumanoir
1834: Les dernières scènes de la fronde, drama in 3 acts
1834: Le curé Mérino, drama in 5 acts, with Bernard and Pierre Tournemine
1834: L'honneur dans le crime, drama in 5 acts
1835: La nonne sanglante, drama in 5 acts, with Anicet Bourgeois
1835: Roger, ou Le curé de Champaubert, drama-vaudeville in 2 acts, with Armand d'Artois
1835: Un de ses frères, souvenir historique de 1807, mingled with couplets, with Dumanoir
1835: La Fille de Robert Macaire, comical melodrama in 2 acts, with Mathieu Barthélemy Thouin
1835: La Tache de sang, drama in 3 acts, music by Philippe-Alexis Béancourt, after Auguste-Louis-Désiré Boulé
1836: Le Vagabond, drame populaire in 1 act, with Cormon
1837: L'esclave Andréa, drama in 5 acts
1837: La Dame de Laval, drama in 3 acts and 6 tableaux
1837: Henriette Wilson, comédie en vaudevilles in 2 acts, with Dumanoir
1837: Le réfractaire, ou Une nuit de la mi-carême, vaudeville in 2 acts, with Eugène Cormon
1837: Thomas Maurevert, drama in 5 acts preceded by a prologue
1838: La croix de feu ou Les pieds noirs d'Irlande, melodrama in 3 acts, with Louis Marie Fontan
1838: Deux vieux garçons, vaudeville in 1 act, with Louis-Émile Vanderburch
1838: La Femme au salon et le mari à l'atelier, comédie en vaudevilles on 2 acts, with Cormon
1839: Le massacre des innocents, drama in 5 acts, with Fontan
1839: La Fille de l'émir, drama in 2 acts
1841: Le Perruquier de l'Empereur, drama in 5 acts, with Charles Dupeuty
1842: Les brigands de la Loire, drama in 5 acts, with Félix Dutertre de Véteuil
1842: Le Diable des Pyrénées, drama in 3 acts
1845: Marie-Jeanne ou La femme du peuple, drama in 5 acts, with Adolphe d'Ennery, 1845
1845: Une expiation, drama in 4 acts, mingled with song
1846: Le château des sept tours, preceded by Les français en Égypte, épisode de 1799, prologue, drama in 5 acts, with Pujol
1847: La révolution française, drama in 4 acts and 16 tableaux, with Fabrice Labrousse
1849: Le Moulin des tilleuls, opéra comique in 1 act, with Cormon

Bibliography 
 Jean Marie Querard, Les supercheries littéraires dévoilées, 1853, p. 278
 Louis Gabriel Michaud, Biographie universelle ancienne et moderne, 1860, p. 267 
 Georges d'Heylli, Dictionnaire des pseudonymes, 1869, p. 234
 James Grant Wilson, John Fiske, Appletons' Cyclopaedia of American Biography, vol.4, 1898, p. 183
 Jack Corzani, La Littérature des Antilles-Guyane françaises, vol.1, 1978, p. 154

External links 
 Julien de Mallian on Data.bnf.fr

19th-century French dramatists and playwrights
Guadeloupean dramatists and playwrights
1805 births
1851 deaths
People from Le Moule